Agonopterix quadripunctata is a moth of the family Depressariidae. It is found in Fennoscandia, Estonia, Latvia, Russia, Germany, Poland, the Czech Republic, Slovakia, Italy and North Macedonia.

The wingspan is 15–18 mm. Adults are on wing from May to August.

The larvae feed on Seseli and Cnidium species, including Cnidium dubium.

References

External links
lepiforum.de

Moths described in 1857
Agonopterix
Moths of Europe